Delta Aquarii (δ Aquarii, abbreviated Delta Aqr, δ Aqr), officially named Skat , is the third-brightest star in the constellation of Aquarius. The apparent visual magnitude is 3.3, which can be seen with the naked eye. The distance to this star is about  based upon parallax measurements, and it has a close companion.

Nomenclature
δ Aquarii (Latinised to Delta Aquarii) is the star's Bayer designation.  It also has the Flamsteed designation 76 Aquarii.

It bore the traditional name Skat (also rendered Scheat, Seat, Sheat, etc., which was erroneously applied to Beta Pegasi in late medieval times), from the Arabic الساق al-sāq "shin".

In 2016, the International Astronomical Union organized a Working Group on Star Names (WGSN) to catalogue and standardize proper names for stars. The WGSN approved the name Skat for this star on 21 August 2016, and it is now so included in the List of IAU-approved Star Names.
 

Properties

The spectrum of Delta Aquarii matches a stellar classification of A3 Vp, indicating this is a chemically peculiar A-type main-sequence star that is generating energy through the nuclear fusion of hydrogen at its core. This star has double the Sun's mass and a radius 2.4 times as large. It is radiating 26 times the luminosity of the Sun from its outer atmosphere at an effective temperature of around 9,000 K. This heat gives it the characteristic white-hued glow of an A-type star. It has a relatively high rate of rotation, with a projected rotational velocity of 81 km s−1.

Delta Aquarii does not display a strong signal of excess infrared emission that might indicate the presence of circumstellar matter. Delta Aquarii is a probable stream star member of the Ursa Major Moving Group, which has an estimated age of 500 million years.

Companion

An analysis of Hipparcos data strongly suggested a close companion object. An orbit was derived with a 483-day period, an eccentricity of 0.12, and an inclination of 41°. When Delta Aquarii was first examined for the companion, it could not be seen.

References

External links 
 Star names derived from Arabic 
 Image Delta Aquarii

A-type main-sequence stars
Ursa Major Moving Group

Skat
Aquarius (constellation)
Aquarii, Delta
BD-16 6173
Aquarii, 076
216627
113136
8709
Binary stars
Ap stars